Palliser is a residential neighbourhood in the southwest quadrant of Calgary, Alberta. It is bounded to the north by 90 Ave SW, to the east by 19 Street SW, to the south by Southland Drive SW and to the west by 24 Street SW. The Tom Brook Athletic Park is located within the neighbourhood.

Named after John Palliser, an early explorer and geographer of western Canada, the neighbourhood was established in 1967. Until 1991 it included the community of Pump Hill. It is represented in the Calgary City Council by the Ward 11 councillor.

Demographics

Residents in this community had a median household income of $57,603 in 2000, and there were 7.3% low income residents living in the neighbourhood. As of 2000, 20.2% of the residents were immigrants. A proportion of 40.1% of the buildings were condominiums or apartments, and 36.8% of the housing was used for renting.

Education
The community is served by Nellie McClung Elementary School and John Ware Junior High School as well as by St. Benedict Elementary School, a separate school. Nellie McClung Elementary has a GATE program.

See also
List of neighbourhoods in Calgary

References

External links
Palliser-Bay View-Pump Hill Community Associationa

Neighbourhoods in Calgary